is a Japanese politician, and was formerly a singer, actress, and racing driver. She is a member of the Liberal Democratic Party.

Entertainment career
Mihara made her debut as a teenager in the 1979 television series Kinpachi-sensei, and began a singing career in 1980. Her first hit sold more than 300,000 copies.

In 1987, she began competing in auto racing. Mihara drove a Toyota Corolla in the Japanese Touring Car Championship from 1990 to 1991, sharing the car with her husband Masahiro Matsunaga and Shinichi Yamaji. From 1992 to 1995, she raced in the Spa 24 Hours in Belgium, followed by the All Japan Grand Touring Car Championship with Kumi Sato in 1996 and 1997; Mihara and Sato were co-drivers in the 1995 Spa 24 Hours. In 1998, she and Sato participated in the American Toyota Pro/Celebrity Race at the Grand Prix of Long Beach. Mihara remained involved in racing—particularly the JGTC's successor Super GT—after entering politics, serving as the secretary general of the Liberal Democratic Party's Parliamentary League for Motorsports.

Mihara underwent treatment for cervical cancer later in her life, and established a nursing home in March 2010 prior to her political debut.

Political career
Mihara ran in the House of Councillors election in July 2010 as a proportional candidate of the Liberal Democratic Party and won, campaigning on her experience with women's health issues. She first appeared in the Diet on 30 July 2010. She was elected to a seat representing the Kanagawa at-large district in the July 2016 election.

Positions within the LDP:

Deputy Director, Health, Labor and Welfare Division of LDP
Deputy chairman, Committee on Organizations Involved with Labor of LDP
Acting Director, Public Speeches Division of LDP
Vice-Chairman, Committee on Organizations Involved with Health and Welfare of LDP

Controversies
Mihara is in favor of visits to the controversial Yasukuni Shrine.

In March 2015, when speaking about dealing with tax evasion she urged Prime Minister Shinzō Abe to promote hakkō ichiu, a slogan meaning "the world under one roof", meaning the world united under the Japanese empire.

References

External links 
 Official site (in Japanese)
 
 
 

1964 births
People from Itabashi
Living people
Japanese actor-politicians
Female members of the House of Councillors (Japan)
Members of the House of Councillors (Japan)
Actresses from Tokyo
Politicians from Tokyo
Liberal Democratic Party (Japan) politicians
Singers from Tokyo
Japanese sportsperson-politicians
Japanese female racing drivers
Japanese Touring Car Championship drivers
TOM'S drivers